The William & Mary Tribe football program has represented the College of William & Mary in intercollegiate college football competition since 1893.  The team has competed in the National Collegiate Athletic Association (NCAA) Division I since its formation in 1973.  From 1956 to 1972 William & Mary competed in the NCAA University Division. William & Mary fielded its first intercollegiate football team during the 1893 season. Between 1896 and 1908 the team's nickname was "Orange and White," derived from the school's former colors (William & Mary now uses green and gold). Since white uniforms dirtied too quickly, they became known as the "Orange and Black" from 1910 through 1916. Between 1917 and 1977 they were known as the Indians, and throughout this period a man dressing up as a Native American would ride around on a pony along the sidelines during games. This practice was discontinued when the outcry of stereotyping Native Americans as well as the use of a live animal became controversial. Since the 1978 season William & Mary has adopted the nickname "Tribe."

Through the 2019 season, there have been 31 different head coaches in school history. Among them, three have been inducted into the College Football Hall of Fame: Bill Fincher (1974), Bill Ingram (1973), and Lou Holtz (2008). Another coach—Marv Levy—was inducted into the Pro Football Hall of Fame in 2001. The all-time winningest coach in terms of total wins is Jimmye Laycock. Over a 39-year tenure (1980–2018) he amassed 249 wins, which is over five times more than the next closest head coach, Rube McCray, who had 45. The coach with the highest win percentage is Carl M. Voyles: he amassed a 78.2 winning percentage between 1939 and 1942, going 29–7–3 overall.

Despite having over 500 wins in its history, William & Mary football has never won a national championship. The Tribe have been to the FCS/I-AA playoffs 10 times through 2018 but have never reached the national championship game; twice they have reached the semi-finals. William & Mary has won bowl games, however. They defeated Oklahoma A&M in the 1949 Delta Bowl, 20–0, and also won two Epson Ivy Bowls in the 1990s. Seven different coaches have coached the Tribe to conference titles. Thomas Dowler, in his lone season at the helm, guided William & Mary to the Virginia Conference championship in 1935. Unsurprisingly, Jimmye Laycock has the most all-time titles with five, plus a divisional championship which was won in 1993.

Key

Coaches
Statistics correct as of the end of the 2022 season

Notes

References
General

Specific

William and Mary
 
Virginia sports-related lists